The Flintstones: The Surprise at Dinosaur Peak is a platform game for the Nintendo Entertainment System released by Taito in 1994. The game was never released in Japan unlike its predecessor The Flintstones: The Rescue of Dino & Hoppy.

Gameplay 

The player can switch playable characters between both Fred and Barney, and they both have different attacks and abilities. Fred can use a club to bash enemies while his friend Barney has a slingshot and can use it at a certain distance to attack enemies. Some parts of the game require different strategies often cases where you will have to swap one to another automatically in order to get past certain obstacles or jump onto certain platforms. Fred can also throw an item that will stun or completely kill an enemy or boss.

Development and release 

The Flintstones: The Surprise at Dinosaur Peak is believed to have been released in North America exclusively to Blockbuster Video as a rental title.  Though despite constantly being cited as such in modern online reviews and websites, no evidence has been found. Some have even refuted the claim by saying that the game was sold in regular stores. Despite this, it remains one of the rarest games for the NES due to its late release during the console's production cycle and a low number of copies produced. As of 2017 copies of the game available on eBay and other similar sites usually sell for over $800 USD to as high as $1,500 as of 2016. In Europe, the game is slightly more common and cheaper but still typically sells for over US$1,000.

Reception 

Allgame gave a review score of 4 out of 5 stars criticized the recycled animation from previous Flintstones game and noting the polished graphics and praising the ability to switch between Fred and Barney and both characters have different weapons and abilities.

References

1994 video games
Nintendo Entertainment System games
Nintendo Entertainment System-only games
Platform games
Taito games
Video games based on The Flintstones
Video game sequels
Cartoon Network video games
Video games developed in Japan
Single-player video games